WJIA (88.5 FM, "88.5 J-FM") is a non-commercial radio station licensed to serve Guntersville, Alabama, United States.  The station is owned by Lake City Educational Broadcasting Inc.

WJIA broadcasts a Contemporary Christian music format.

History
Pastor Stan Broadus originally attempted to purchase an existing Albertville, Alabama-based AM radio station in 1992 for his ministry but, after considering the cost and complication, his radio consultant persuaded him that starting a new non-commercial FM station would be easier and less expensive. In January 1993, he filed for a construction permit to build a new FM station as Lake City Educational Broadcasting Inc.

This station received its original construction permit from the Federal Communications Commission on December 23, 1993. The new station was assigned the call letters WAHF by the FCC on February 11, 1994. During construction, the station switched callsigns to the current WJIA on May 23, 1994. WJIA received its license to cover from the FCC on June 24, 1997.

References

External links
WJIA official website

Contemporary Christian radio stations in the United States
Radio stations established in 1995
Marshall County, Alabama
JIA